Miltochrista prominens is a moth of the family Erebidae first described by Frederic Moore in 1878. It is found in Assam, India.

References

prominens
Moths described in 1878
Moths of Asia